This article contains information about the literary events and publications of 1940.

Events
January – The English literary magazine Horizon first appears in London, with Cyril Connolly, Peter Watson and Stephen Spender contributing.
February – The Canadian writer Robertson Davies leaves the Old Vic repertory company in the U.K.
March 11 – Ed Ricketts, John Steinbeck and six others leave Monterey for the Gulf of California on a marine invertebrate collecting expedition.
April – Máirtín Ó Cadhain is interned by the Irish government at Curragh Camp, as a member of the Irish Republican Army.
May 14 – The Battle of the Netherlands ends with the surrender of the main Dutch forces to Nazi German invaders. This evening, the gay Dutch Jewish writer Jacob Hiegentlich takes poison, dying four days later aged 33.
June 5 – The English novelist J. B. Priestley broadcasts his first Sunday evening radio Postscript, "An excursion to hell", on the BBC Home Service in the U.K., marking the role of pleasure steamers in the Dunkirk evacuation, which ended the day before.
July
Jean-Paul Sartre is taken prisoner by the Germans. Léopold Sédar Senghor also becomes a prisoner of war this year. P. G. Wodehouse is interned by the Germans as an enemy alien.
American science fiction and fantasy pulp magazine Fantastic Novels begins its first run.
July 26 – A movie adaptation of Jane Austen's Pride and Prejudice is released, with Aldous Huxley as a screenwriter.
September – In Uriage-les-Bains, Vichy France, Emmanuel Mounier and the Esprit circle establish a school of government and philosophy attuned to Catholic social teaching. Initially endorsing the Révolution nationale, Uriage is put off by Vichy's collaboration with Germany, and blends into the Christian left.
September 10 – Virginia Woolf's London house at 37 Mecklenburgh Square is destroyed by bombing. On October 18 she sees the ruins of her previous home, 52 Tavistock Square, Bloomsbury, similarly destroyed.
October 
Graham Greene's London house on Clapham Common Northside is destroyed by bombing, an event reflected in his novels The Ministry of Fear (1943) and The End of the Affair (1951).
Philip Larkin enters St John's College, Oxford.
October 4 – Brian O'Nolan's first  "Cruiskeen Lawn" humorous column is published in The Irish Times (Dublin). In the second column he assumes the pseudonym Myles na gCopaleen. The original columns are composed in Irish. He continues the column until the year of his death in 1966.
December – Penguin Books launches its Puffin Books children's imprint in the United Kingdom with War on Land by James Holland.
December 21 – F. Scott Fitzgerald dies of a heart attack aged 44 in the apartment of Hollywood gossip columnist Sheilah Graham, leaving his novel The Last Tycoon unfinished. The following day, his friend and fellow novelist and screenwriter, Nathanael West, is killed aged 37 in an automobile accident in California.
December 29 – Heavy bombing causes a Second Great Fire of London, destroying the premises of Simpkin, Marshall, the U.K.'s largest book wholesaler, and of many publishers also in the Paternoster Row area, including Longman, together with some 25,000 volumes in the Guildhall Library's stores and a copy of the Rubaiyat of Omar Khayyam in a jewelled binding by Sangorski & Sutcliffe (1939). On dawn patrol as a fighter pilot, Douglas Blackwood sees his family's publishing business, William Blackwood, burning.
December 31 – Echternacher Anzeiger, a Luxembourg newspaper ends publication.
unknown dates
The Russian poet Anna Akhmatova's collection From Six Books appears in the Soviet Union, but distribution is soon suspended, copies pulped and remaining issues prohibited.
Wills & Hepworth of Loughborough begins publishing Ladybird Books in the United Kingdom in a new format, with Bunnykin's Picnic Party: a story in verse for children with illustrations in colour.

New books

Fiction
 Eric Ambler – Journey into Fear
Thomas Armstrong – The Crowthers of Bankdam
Frank Baker – Miss Hargreaves
Pridi Banomyong – The King of the White Elephant
Giorgio Bassani – Una città di pianura
Henry Bellamann – Kings Row
Pierre Benoit – The Environs of Aden
 Phyllis Bottome – Heart of a Child
 Marjorie Bowen – The Crime of Laura Sarelle
Karin Boye – Kallocain
 Lynn Brock – The Stoat
Douglas Brown and Christopher Serpell – Loss of Eden: a cautionary tale
Heðin Brú – Feðgar á ferð (The Old Man and His Sons)
Edgar Rice Burroughs – Synthetic Men of Mars
Dino Buzzati – The Tartar Steppe (Il deserto dei Tartari)
Arthur Calder-Marshall – The Way to Santiago
Erskine Caldwell – Trouble in July
Taylor Caldwell – The Earth is the Lord's
 Victor Canning – Mr. Finchley Takes the Road
Joyce Carey – Charley is My Darling
John Dickson Carr
The Department of Queer Complaints
The Man Who Could Not Shudder
And So To Murder (as Carter Dickson)
Murder in the Submarine Zone (as Carter Dickson)
Adolfo Bioy Casares – The Invention of Morel (La invención de Morel)
Willa Cather – Sapphira And The Slave
Raymond Chandler – Farewell, My Lovely
Peter Cheyney 
 You Can't Keep the Change
 You'd Be Surprised
Agatha Christie
Sad Cypress
One, Two, Buckle My Shoe
Walter Clark – The Ox-bow Incident
 Freeman Wills Crofts – Golden Ashes
James Daugherty – Daniel Boone
Georges Duhamel – Les Maîtres
Mircea Eliade – The Secret of Dr. Honigberger (Secretul doctorului Honigberger; published with Nights at Serampore)
Margita Figuli – Three Chestnut Horses
 Anthony Gilbert – Dear Dead Woman
Graham Greene – The Power and the Glory
Ernest Hemingway – For Whom the Bell Tolls
Georgette Heyer – The Corinthian
Anne Hocking – The Wicked Flee
Dorothy B. Hughes – The So Blue Marble
 Hammond Innes 
The Trojan Horse
Wreckers Must Breathe
 Michael Innes 
  The Secret Vanguard
 There Came Both Mist and Snow
Anna Kavan – Asylum Piece (short stories)
Arthur Koestler – Darkness at Noon
E. C. R. Lorac – Death at Dyke's Corner
Marie Belloc Lowndes – The Christine Diamond
Carson McCullers – The Heart Is a Lonely Hunter
Ngaio Marsh – Death at the Bar
W. Somerset Maugham – The Mixture as Before (short stories)
Gladys Mitchell – Brazen Tongue
Nancy Mitford – Pigeon Pie
John O'Hara – Pal Joey
E. Phillips Oppenheim – Last Train Out
Raymond Postgate – Verdict of Twelve
John Cowper Powys – Owen Glendower
Clayton Rawson -- The Headless Lady
Michael Sadleir – Fanny by Gaslight
Mikhail Sholokov – The Don Flows Home to the Sea (English translation of part 2 of Тихий Дон – Tikhii Don, The Quiet Don)
C. P. Snow – George Passant (first in the Strangers and Brothers series)
Christina Stead – The Man Who Loved Children
Rex Stout
Over My Dead Body
Where There's a Will
Cecil Street 
 Death on the Boat Train
 Death Takes a Flat
 Mr. Westerby Missing
 Murder at Lilac Cottage
Phoebe Atwood Taylor
The Criminal C. O. D.
The Deadly Sunshade
The Left Leg (as Alice Tilton)
Dylan Thomas – Portrait of the Artist as a Young Dog (short stories)
Luis Trenker – Captain Ladurner
Sachchidananda Vatsyayan – Shekhar: Ek Jivani
 Henry Wade – Lonely Magdalen
Richard Wright – Native Son
Francis Brett Young – Mr. Lucton's Freedom
Xiao Hong (蕭紅) – Ma Bole (马伯乐)

Children and young people
Enid Blyton – The Naughtiest Girl in the School
Godfried Bomans – Eric in the Land of the Insects (Erik of het klein insectenboek)
Ingri and Edgar Parin d'Aulaire – Abraham Lincoln
Doris Gates – Blue Willow
Dorothy Kunhardt – Pat the Bunny
Phyllis Matthewman – Chloe Takes Control (first in the Danewood series of seven books)
Arthur Ransome – The Big Six
Marjorie Kinnan Rawlings – When the Whippoorwill
Dr. Seuss – Horton Hatches the Egg
Armstrong Sperry – Call It Courage
Jakob Streit – Beatuslegenden
Geoffrey Trease – Cue for Treason
John R. Tunis – The Kid from Tomkinsville
Laura Ingalls Wilder – The Long Winter

Drama
Jean Anouilh – Léocadia
Ugo Betti – Il cacciatore di anitre (The Duck Hunter)
 Peter Blackmore – The Blue Goose
Bertolt Brecht – Mr Puntila and his Man Matti (Herr Puntila und sein Knecht Matti, written)
Agatha Christie – Peril at End House
Jean Cocteau – Le Bel indifférent
Artturi Järviluoma – Pohjalaisia
Terence Rattigan and Anthony Goldsmith – Follow My Leader (first performed)
Lawrence Riley – Return Engagement
George Shiels – The Rugged Path
Vernon Sylvaine – Nap Hand
John Van Druten – 
 Leave Her to Heaven
 Old Acquaintance
Emlyn Williams 
The Corn Is Green
The Light of Heart

Non-fiction
Mortimer J. Adler – How to Read a Book
"Cato" (Michael Foot, Frank Owen, and Peter Howard) – Guilty Men
George Gamow – The Birth and Death of the Sun
G. H. Hardy – A Mathematician's Apology
Bernard Leach – A Potter's Book
C. S. Lewis – The Problem of Pain
Karl Mannheim – Man and Society in the Age of Reconstruction
Arthur Marder – The Anatomy of British Sea Power: a history of British naval policy in the pre-Dreadnought era, 1880–1905
A. A. Milne – War with Honour
Malcolm Muggeridge – The Thirties
Hugh Trevor-Roper – Archbishop Laud, 1573–1645
Edmund Wilson – To the Finland Station

Births
January 4 – Gao Xingjian (高行健), Chinese novelist
January 15 – Ted Lewis, English novelist (died 1982)
January 23 – Mario Levrero, Uruguayan novelist (died 2004)
February 6 – Tom Brokaw, American television journalist and author
February 8 – Ted Koppel, American journalist
February 9 
 J. M. Coetzee, South African novelist
 Seamus Deane, Irish poet and novelist (died 2021)
March 16 – Bernardo Bertolucci, Italian writer and film director
March 23 – Ama Ata Aidoo, Ghanaian playwright
March 28 – Russell Banks, American novelist and poet (died 2023)
April 6 - Homero Aridjis, Mexican poet, novelist and environmentalist
April 13 – J. M. G. Le Clézio, French novelist
April 15 – Jeffrey Archer, English novelist, politician and perjurer
April 24 – Sue Grafton, American detective novelist (died 2017)
May 1 – Bobbie Ann Mason, American novelist, short story writer, essayist and literary critic
May 7 – Angela Carter, English novelist (died 1992)
May 8 – Peter Benchley, American novelist (died 2006)
May 13 – Bruce Chatwin, English novelist and travel writer (died 1989)
May 24 – Joseph Brodsky, Russian-born American poet and essayist (died 1996)
May 28 – Maeve Binchy, Irish novelist (died 2012)
July 17 – Tim Brooke-Taylor, English comedy writer and performer
July 30 – Alice Azure, American poet and writer
July 31 – Fleur Jaeggy, Swiss-Italian fiction writer
September 1 – Annie Ernaux, French author and Nobel laureate
September 3 – Eduardo Galeano, Uruguayan journalist, writer and novelist (died 2015)
September 14 – Ventseslav Konstantinov, Bulgarian writer and translator (died 2019)
October 11 – David McFadden, Canadian poet, fiction and travel writer (died 2018)
October 15 – Fanny Howe, American poet, novelist and short story writer
October 20 – Robert Pinsky, American poet
November 15 – René Avilés Fabila, Mexican writer (died 2016)
November 20 – Wendy Doniger O'Flaherty, American Indologist and translator
December 5 – Peter Pohl, Swedish novelist
December 29 – Brigitte Kronauer, German novelist (died 2019)
Stan Grant, Wiradjuri Australian writer

Deaths
January 1 – Panuganti Lakshminarasimha Rao, Indian writer (born 1865)
January 5 – Humbert Wolfe, British poet and epigrammist (born 1885)
January 27 – Isaak Babel, Russian journalist and dramatist (executed, born 1894)
February 11 – John Buchan, Scottish novelist (born 1875)
February 29
E. F. Benson, English novelist, biographer, memoirist and short-story writer (born 1867)
Emma Shaw Colcleugh, American author  (born 1846)
March 7 – Edwin Markham, American poet (born 1852)
March 10 – Mikhail Bulgakov, Russian novelist and playwright (born 1891)
March 11 – John Monk Saunders, American writer (born 1897)
March 12 – Florence White, English food writer (born 1863)
March 16
Sir Thomas Little Heath, English classicist and translator (born 1861)
Selma Lagerlöf, Swedish children's writer and Nobel laureate (born 1858)
April 13 – Mary Bathurst Deane, English novelist (born 1843)
June 1 – Jan F. E. Celliers, South African Afrikaans-language poet, essayist, dramatist and critic (born 1865)
June 10 – Marcus Garvey, Jamaican journalist and publisher (born 1887)
June 20 – Charley Chase, American screenwriter (born 1893)
June 21 – Hendrik Marsman, Dutch poet (born 1899)
August 4 – Ze'ev Jabotinsky, Russian-born Zionist leader, novelist and poet (heart attack, born 1880)
August 7 – T. O'Conor Sloane, American editor (born 1851)
September 8 – Constantin Banu, Romanian politician, journalist, cultural promoter and aphorist (born 1873)
September 26 – W. H. Davies, Welsh poet (born 1871)
November 27 – Nicolae Iorga, Romanian historian, politician, culture critic, poet and playwright (assassinated, born 1871)
December 21 – F. Scott Fitzgerald, American novelist (born 1896)
December 22 – Nathanael West, American screenwriter and satirist (born 1903)

Awards
Carnegie Medal for children's literature: Kitty Barne, Visitors from London
James Tait Black Memorial Prize for fiction: Charles Morgan, The Voyage
James Tait Black Memorial Prize for biography: Hilda F. M. Prescott, Spanish Tudor: Mary I of England
Newbery Medal for children's literature: James Daugherty, Daniel Boone
Nobel Prize in literature: not awarded
Prix Goncourt: Francis Ambrière, Les grandes vacances (awarded in retrospect)
Pulitzer Prize for Drama: William Saroyan, The Time of Your Life
Pulitzer Prize for Poetry: Mark Van Doren, Collected Poems
Pulitzer Prize for the Novel: John Steinbeck, The Grapes of Wrath
King's Gold Medal for Poetry: Michael Thwaites

References

 
Years of the 20th century in literature